

See also
 Vietnam War

External links
 Republic of Korea Ministry of National Defense Institute for Military History Compilation (Korean)

Military history of South Korea during the Vietnam War